Aaron Fernandes (born September 13, 1956) is a former field hockey player from Canada, who was member of the Men's National Team that finished in tenth position at the 1984 Summer Olympics in Los Angeles, California.

International senior competitions

 1984 – Olympic Games, Los Angeles (10th)

References

External links 
 
 
 
 

1956 births
Living people
Field hockey players at the 1984 Summer Olympics
Place of birth missing (living people)
Canadian male field hockey players
Olympic field hockey players of Canada